Otto III, Duke of Brunswick-Lüneburg, Lord of Harburg (20 March 1572 in Harburg – 4 August 1641 in Harburg) was a titular Duke of Brunswick-Lüneburg and ruler of the apanage Brunswick-Harburg.

Life 
Otto was a son of Duke Otto II of Brunswick-Harburg (1528-1603) from his second marriage, with Hedwig (1535-1616), the daughter of Count Enno II of East Frisia.

After the death of his brother Christopher in 1606, Otto III and his brother William Augustus ruled Harburg jointly.  Their joint reign was described as harmonious.  In a treaty of 11 January 1630, the brothers renounced their right to succeed in Brunswick-Lüneburg, in favour of Christian, in exchange for Christian paying their debts, which exceeded .

On 14 April 1621 in Wolfenbüttel, Otto III married Hedwig (1580-1657), the daughter of Duke Julius of Brunswick-Wolfenbüttel.  This marriage remained childless.

References 
 August B. Michaelis and Julius Wilhelm Hamberger: Einleitung zu einer volständigen Geschichte der Chur- und Fürstlichen Häuser in Teutschland, vol. 1, Meyer, 1759, p. 121
 Vaterländisches Archiv für hannoverisch-braunschweigische Geschichte, Herold & Wahlstab, 1835, pp. 129, 401 ff, 422, and 424

Footnotes

Princes of Lüneburg
1572 births
1641 deaths
People from Harburg (district)
16th-century German people
17th-century German people
Middle House of Lüneburg